Majed Radhi Mubarak Al-Sayed (born 31 January 1993) is a Kuwaiti decathlete. He won the silver medal at the 2019 Asian Championships. He is the current national record holder in both decathlon and heptathlon.

International competitions

Personal bests
Outdoor
100 metres – 11.22 (+0.8 m/s, Doha 2019)
400 metres – 48.69	 (Cairo 2019)
1500 metres – 4:15.06 (Doha 2019)
110 metres hurdles – 14.98 (0.0 m/s, Doha 2017)
High jump – 1.99 (Doha 2019)
Pole vault – 4.80 (Doha 2019)
Long jump – 7.77 (+0.7 m/s, Bhubaneshwar 2017)
Shot put – 12.98 (Doha 2019)
Discus throw – 37.66 (Doha 2019)
Javelin throw – 56.39 (Cairo 2019)
Decathlon – 7838 (Doha 2019) NR
Indoor
60 metres – 7.23 (Tehran 2018)
1000 metres – 2:51.78 (Tehran 2018)
60 metres hurdles – 8.64 (Tehran 2018)
High jump – 1.88 (Tehran 2018)
Pole vault – 4.40 (Tehran 2018)
Long jump – 7.00 (Tehran 2018)
Shot put – 12.08 (Tehran 2018)
Heptathlon – 5228 (Tehran 2018) NR

References

1993 births
Living people
Kuwaiti decathletes
Asian Indoor Athletics Championships winners
Islamic Solidarity Games competitors for Kuwait
Islamic Solidarity Games medalists in athletics